Sagebach is a river of North Rhine-Westphalia, Germany.  It is 4.5 kilometres long and passes through the Egge Hills. It flows into the Beke in Altenbeken.

See also
List of rivers of North Rhine-Westphalia

Rivers of North Rhine-Westphalia
Rivers of Germany